The Bijela Monastery is a Serbian Orthodox monastery near Bijela village in Šavnik, modern-day Montenegro. The monastery was first mentioned in 1656 while according to some legends it was built in 1010 by duke Vulović from Bijela and ban Kozlina of Tušina, financially supported by Jovan Vladimir. The reconstruction of the monastery began at the end of the 20th century. Its church is dedicated to Saint George, a saint of Drobnjaci clan.

See also 
List of Serbian Orthodox monasteries

References

External links 
 Page on the monastery on the website Eparchy Budim-Nikšić

11th-century Eastern Orthodox church buildings
17th-century Serbian Orthodox church buildings
Serbian Orthodox monasteries in Montenegro
Rebuilt buildings and structures in Montenegro
Christian monasteries established in the 17th century
Šavnik Municipality